Kalika is a Rural municipality located within the Rasuwa District of the Bagmati Province of Nepal.
The municipality spans  of area, with a total population of 9,421 according to a 2011 Nepal census.

On March 10, 2017, the Government of Nepal restructured the local level bodies into 753 new local level structures.
The previous Ramche, small portion of Laharepauwa, Dhaibung and half portion of Bhorle VDCs were merged to form Kalika Rural Municipality.
Kalika is divided into 5 wards, with Dhaibung declared the administrative center of the rural municipality.

References

External links
official website of the rural municipality

Rural municipalities in Rasuwa District
Rural municipalities of Nepal established in 2017